"Tycker om när du tar på mej", is a song written and performed by Per Gessle, and is the third single from his album Mazarin. The song peaked at #9 in Sweden. The song spent a total of 36 weeks on the Svensktoppen chart.

Track listing
"Tycker om när du tar på mej" – 3:25
"Mannen med gitarr" (demo 20 November 2002) – 3:15
"Viskar" (demo 30 August 2002) – 3:29
"Kyss från en främling" (demo 18 October 1999) – 3:03

Charts

References

Per Gessle songs
Songs written by Per Gessle
2003 singles